The Episcopal Diocese of Western New York, is the diocese of the Episcopal Church in the United States of America with jurisdiction over the counties of Cattaraugus, Chautauqua, Erie, Genesee, Niagara, Orleans and Wyoming in western New York. It is in Province 2 and its cathedral,  St. Paul's Cathedral, is in Buffalo. The diocesan offices are in Tonawanda, New York.

Current bishop
Sean W. Rowe is bishop provisional of Western New York. The diocesan convention elected him to this role on October 26, 2018, when it and the convention of the Episcopal Diocese of Northwestern Pennsylvania voted to share a bishop and a staff for five years while they explore a partnership.

R. William "Bill" Franklin was the eleventh bishop of Western New York. The Diocese elected him its eleventh Bishop at its 2010 convention. He was consecrated on April 30, 2011, at the university at Buffalo and retired on April 3, 2019. Franklin was born in Mississippi and had previously served in Philadelphia, Pennsylvania.

Previously, J. Michael Garrison was the tenth bishop of Western New York. He has a bachelor's  and a master's of religious education from Pontifical College Josephinum in Columbus, Ohio and an honorary doctorate from General Theological Seminary in New York City. He was received from the Roman Catholic Church on April 1, 1975, and ordained a deacon on April 12, 1975. He was ordained a priest on August 25, 1975, and consecrated a bishop on April 24, 1999.

List of bishops
The bishops of Western New York have been:

 William H. Delancey, (1839–1865)*Arthur C. Coxe, coadjutor bishop (1865)
 Arthur C. Coxe, (1865–1895)
 William D. Walker, (1897–1917)
 Charles H. Brent, (1919–1929)* David L. Ferris, suffragan bishop (1920*David L. Ferris, coadjutor bishop (1924)
 David L. Ferris, (1929–1931)*Cameron Josiah Davis, coadjutor bishop (1930)
 Cameron Josiah Davis, (1931–1948)
 Lauriston L. Scaife, (1948–1970)*Harold B. Robinson, coadjutor bishop (1968)
 Harold B. Robinson, (1970–1987)*David C. Bowman, coadjutor bishop (1986)
 David C. Bowman, (1987–1998)
 J. Michael Garrison, (1999–2011)
 R. William Franklin,  (2011–2019)
 Sean W. Rowe, as Provisional Bishop (2019–present)

See also

 List of Succession of Bishops for the Episcopal Church, USA

References

External links
 Episcopal Diocese of Western New York website
 Episcopal Diocese of Western New York Records: A guide to digitized church records at FamilySearch.org, courtesy of the Buffalo History Museum.
 Rust Belt Episcopal website
 St. Paul's Cathedral website
Official Web site of the Episcopal Church
Journal of the Annual Convention, Diocese of Western New York

1839 establishments in New York (state)
Anglican dioceses established in the 19th century
Western New York
Episcopal Church in New York (state)
Province 2 of the Episcopal Church (United States)
Religious organizations established in 1839